Alexander Gordon Shelley (born 8 October 1979) is an Echo Music Prize-winning English conductor.  He is currently music director of the National Arts Centre Orchestra in Ottawa, as well as principal associate conductor of the Royal Philharmonic Orchestra. Shelley was the unanimous winner of the 2005 Leeds Conductors Competition. From 2009 to 2017 he was chief conductor of the Nuremberg Symphony Orchestra. He is also artistic director of the Deutsche Kammerphilharmonie Bremen's Echo and Deutsche Gründerpreis winning "Zukunftslabor".

Background
The son of the pianists Howard Shelley OBE and Hilary Macnamara, Shelley learned piano from his mother and cello from his grandmother. In 1992, he won a music scholarship to Westminster School from The Hall School Hampstead. He studied cello with Timothy Hugh, Steven Doane and Johannes Goritzki at the Royal College of Music and at the Robert Schumann Hochschule, Düsseldorf respectively. Master-classes with Mstislav Rostropovich, Janos Starker and Aldo Parisot led him to France, Italy and North America. He was a member of the World Orchestra for Peace during the 2003 tour with Valery Gergiev. He studied conducting with Professor Thomas Gabrisch in Düsseldorf and worked closely with Yan-Pascal Tortelier as his assistant conductor, among others with the National Youth Orchestra of Great Britain.

Early career
In 2001, while still studying in Düsseldorf, he founded the Schumann Camerata, a chamber orchestra with whom he subsequently performed over 80 concerts, including a substantial tour of Russia, with performances in Moscow, Kazan, Simbirsk, Samara, Saratov, Volgograd and Astrachan. In 2005, he won first prize in the 2005 Leeds Conductors Competition, with the press describing him as "the most exciting and gifted young conductor to have taken this highly prestigious award. His conducting technique is immaculate, everything crystal clear and a tool to his inborn musicality." In the same year, Shelley conceived the "440Hz" project, a series of concerts involving prominent German television and stage personalities, to attract young adults to the concert hall. Guest artists have included Konrad Beikircher, Götz Alsmann&Band, Wise Guys (band), Blank & Jones, BASTA, Ensemble Six, Miki, Curse, Reen, Mellow Mark, Ono, Chima, Marlies Petersen and Ralf Bauer.

In 2009, Shelley became Artistic Director of the Zukunftslabor project of the Deutsche Kammerphilharmonie Bremen with whom he went on to win the 2012 Echo Klassik award in the category of Youth Engagement.

Nuremberg Symphony Orchestra
In September 2009, Shelley was named the youngest ever Chief Conductor of the Nuremberg Symphony Orchestra, with an initial contract of four years.  In 2011, his contract was extended to 2017.

During his tenure the orchestra dramatically increased their international touring, travelling to China, Italy, the Czech Republic and Austria. Live recordings of their performances in Vienna's Musikverein and Prague's Smetana Hall were released on Colosseum Records.

For nine consecutive years Shelley conducted and presented Nuremberg's ‘Klassik Open Air’ concerts - Europe's largest annual classical concerts - performing to a combined audience of over 500,000. His final concert was attended by over 80,000 people.

He concluded his Nuremberg tenure at the close of the 2016–2017 season.

Shelley's first album for Deutsche Grammophon, with Daniel Hope and the Stockholm Philharmonic, was released in September 2014. Shelley's second album for Deutsche Grammophon, a recording of Peter and the Wolf with Germany's National Youth Orchestra featuring Die Toten Hosen singer Campino, was awarded the Echo Klassik prize in 2016.

Royal Philharmonic Orchestra
In January 2015, after several years of collaborations as a guest conductor, the Royal Philharmonic Orchestra named Shelley its principal associate conductor, curating an annual series in London's Cadogan Hall, as well as touring nationally and internationally with the orchestra.

Shelley has focused on a variety of themes in his Cadogan Hall programming, including:

2015/ 2016 season: ‘Paris to New York’, celebrating the wide variety of styles and influences on the transatlantic musical output of the 1920s and 1930s.
2016/ 2017 season: ‘Symphonic Soundscapes’, exploring the music of Sibelius and Prokofiev on the 100th anniversary of the October Revolution.
2017/ 2018 season: ‘Myths and Fairytales’, which featured the many scores that have taken inspiration from the literature of myths and fairytales. 
2018/2019 season: ‘Seeking New Horizons’, a series of concerts that looks at the influence of immigration on the music of the last 150 years.
2019/2020 season: 'Composer 360', exploring musical influences and relationships that inspired great composers.

National Arts Centre Orchestra
In October 2013, the NACO announced the appointment of Shelley as its youngest ever Music Director, succeeding Pinchas Zukerman as of the 2015–2016 season, with an initial contract of 4 years. In 2018. it was announced that Alexander Shelley had renewed his contract as Music Director of the NAC Orchestra through to 2023.

Major creative projects since the beginning of his tenure have included the commissioning of "Life Reflected", a multi-media exploration of the lives of four Canadian women (Rita Joe, Roberta Bondar, Alice Munro and Amanda Todd) and ENCOUNT3RS, a set of three new ballets in collaboration with the National Ballet of Canada, Ballet BC and Alberta Ballet Company. The seven new scores that Shelley and the NAC Orchestra commissioned for these projects were recorded on the Analekta label in 2016 and 2017 respectively.

For two years running, works commissioned and recorded by Shelley and the NAC Orchestra won the Juno Award in the Classical Composition of the Year category, with Jocelyn Morlock winning in 2018 for her work 'My Name is Amanda Todd' from NAC Orchestra's Life reflected album, and Ana Sokolovic winning in 2019 for 'Golden Slumbers Kiss Your Eyes' from the NAC Orchestra's album Bounds of our Dreams.

Shelley has led two major tours with the NAC Orchestra. In 2017, Shelley and the NAC Orchestra undertook a cross-country tour of Canada in celebration of Canada's 150th anniversary. In the spring of 2019, Shelley led the NAC Orchestra on a landmark European tour in celebration of the National Arts Centre's 50th Anniversary. Over 17 days, they travelled to Saffron-Walden, London, Paris, Utrecht, Copenhagen, Stockholm and Gothenburg. The tour marked the first international performances of the NAC Orchestra's flagship Life Reflected project. Entitled CROSSINGS, the tour included  eight concerts featuring four internationally renowned Canadian soloists: Jan Lisiecki, James Ehnes, Erin Wall and David D Q Lee. Each and every concert included at least one major work by a Canadian composer. The tour also  included 60 learning activities and community events. Wherever they went, Shelley and NAC Orchestra musicians worked with community partners and young musicians to share their passion, make some music, and offer workshops and master classes.

Guest conducting
Shelley appears as a guest conductor on 6 continents. Alongside his positions in Ottawa and London, regular collaborators include Deutsches Symphonie-Orchester Berlin, Konzerthausorchester Berlin, Leipzig Gewandhaus Orchestra, Orchestre de la Suisse Romande, Royal Stockholm Philharmonic Orchestra, Gothenburg Symphony Orchestra, Melbourne Symphony Orchestra, Sydney Symphony Orchestra, New Zealand Symphony Orchestra, Hong Kong Philharmonic Orchestra, Malaysian Philharmonic Orchestra, Orquesta Sinfónica Simón Bolívar and Orquestra Sinfônica do Estado de São Paulo.

Shelley has a close relationship with Germany's National Youth Orchestra (Bundesjugendorchester), having led them on two separate tours of Germany. In November 2018 the orchestra sat side by side with the National Arts Centre Orchestra for a performance of Benjamin Britten's War Requiem, in commemoration of the 100th anniversary of the end of World War 1. In the summer of 2019 Shelley led the Bundesjugendorchester on a tour of Germany and Africa.

To date, Shelley has conducted over 32 world premiere performances.

Opera
Shelley's professional opera conducting debut was for Royal Danish Opera in 2008, conducting a production of The Merry Widow. He has since led productions of Gounod's Romeo et Juliette (Royal Danish Opera), Mozart's Cosi fan tutte (Opéra national de Montpellier) and Marriage of Figaro (Opera North), La Bohème (Opera Lyra)  and Louis Riel (Canadian Opera Company/ National Arts Centre).

Personal and philanthropy

Shelley and his wife Zoe, a personal trainer and fitness model, were married in July 2011 at St Paul's Church, Knightsbridge. They have two sons, Sasha Felix Shelley, born in Ottawa on August 25, 2018 and Leo Arlen Shelley, born in Ottawa on June 6, 2021.

Shelley is the Dance4Life Ambassador for Germany and patron of House meets Charity e.v. Along with Angela Hewitt, he is one of the two current OrKidstra Ambassadors.

Discography
2010
Nürnberger Symphoniker Live in Prag (Nürnberger Symphoniker and Oliver Triendl on Colosseum Records)

2011
Nürnberger Symphoniker Live in Wien (Nürnberger Symphoniker on Colosseum Records)

2014
Escape to Paradise (Stockholm Philharmonic and Daniel Hope on Deutsche Grammophon)

2015
Brahms Violin Concerto/ Double Concerto (Nürnberger Symphoniker, Eric Schumann, Mark Schumann on Berlin Classics) 

2015
Peter and the Wolf in Hollywood (Bundesjugendorchester, Alice Cooper on Deutsche Grammophon) (ECHO Klassik 2016)

2017
Life Reflected (National Arts Centre Orchestra on Analekta)

2017
Encount3rs (National Arts Centre Orchestra on Analekta)

2018
New Worlds (National Arts Centre Orchestra on Analekta)

2018
Bounds of our Dreams (National Arts Centre Orchestra on Analekta)

2019
American Recorder Concertos (Copenhagen Philharmonic, Michala Petri)

2020
Darlings of the Muses (National Arts Centre Orchestra, Gabriela Montero on Analekta)

References

External links
 Alexander Shelley Homepage
 Askonas Holt agency biography of Alexander Shelley
 National Arts Centre Website
 Royal Philharmonic Orchestra Website

British male conductors (music)
English conductors (music)
1979 births
Living people
Prize-winners of the Leeds Conductors Competition
Alumni of the Royal College of Music
People educated at Westminster School, London
Robert Schumann Hochschule alumni
21st-century British conductors (music)
21st-century British male musicians